Dame Janet Laughland Nelson  (born 1942), also known as Jinty Nelson, is a British historian. She is Emerita Professor of Medieval History at King's College London.

Early life
Born on 28 March 1942 in Blackpool, Nelson was educated at Keswick School, Cumbria, and at Newnham College, Cambridge, where she received her BA degree in 1964 and her PhD degree in 1967.

Career
She was appointed a lecturer at King's College, London, in 1970, promoted to Reader in 1987, to Professor in 1993, and Director of the Centre for Late Antique and Medieval Studies in 1994, retiring in 2007. She was President of the Ecclesiastical History Society (1993–94) and was a Vice-President of the British Academy (2000–01). In 2013 she gave the British Academy's Raleigh Lecture on History. She was the first female President of the Royal Historical Society (2000–04). The Jinty Nelson Award for Inspirational Teaching & Supervision in History was established by the Royal Historical Society in January 2018.

Her research to date has been focused on early medieval Europe, including Anglo-Saxon England. She has published widely on kingship, government, political ideas, religion and ritual, and increasingly on women and gender during this period. From 2000 to 2010 she co-directed, with Simon Keynes (of Cambridge University), the AHRC-funded project Prosopography of Anglo-Saxon England.
Her book King and Emperor, a biography of Charlemagne, was published in 2019.

Honours
Nelson was appointed a DBE in 2006 and holds honorary doctorates from the Universities of East Anglia (2004), St Andrews (2007), Queen's University Belfast (2009), York (2010),  Liverpool (2010) and Nottingham (2010).

Works
 
 (with D. Kempf) ed., Reading the Bible in the Middle Ages (Bloomsbury Publishing, 2015)
 Courts, Elites and Gendered Power in the Early Middle Ages (Aldershot, 2007)
 (with P. Wormald) ed., Lay Intellectuals in the Carolingian World (Cambridge, 2007)
 ed., Timothy Reuter, Medieval Politics and Modern Mentalities (Cambridge, 2007)
 (with P. Stafford and J. Martindale) ed., Law, Laity and Solidarities: Essays in Honour of Susan Reynolds (Manchester, 2001)
 (with P. Linehan) ed.,The Medieval World (London, 2001); 2003 pbk edition
 (with F. Theuws) ed., Rituals of Power from Late Antiquity to the Early Middle Ages (Leiden, 2000)
 Rulers and Ruling Families in Earlier Medieval Europe (London, 1999); 2019 pbk edition
 The Frankish World, 750–900 (London, 1996)
 Charles the Bald (London, 1992); 2013 pbk edition
 
 Politics and Ritual in Early Medieval Europe (London, 1986)

Nelson has also appeared on BBC television and radio, notably as an expert on the Anglo-Saxon Kings in Michael Wood's 2013 series on the subject.

References

External links
 Biography on the King's College London website
 Transcript of interview at the Institute of Historical Research, London, 30 May 2008

1942 births
Living people
People from Cumbria
People educated at Keswick School
Alumni of Newnham College, Cambridge
English historians
Academics of King's College London
Fellows of King's College London
Presidents of the Royal Historical Society
Fellows of the Royal Historical Society
Dames Commander of the Order of the British Empire
Fellows of the British Academy
Place of birth missing (living people)
Presidents of the Ecclesiastical History Society
British women historians
Corresponding Fellows of the Medieval Academy of America